The Little Man is a stock character best known for appearing in the original Pink Panther shorts created by David DePatie and Friz Freleng. He is considered the main antagonist of the Pink Panther series.

History
The Little Man first appeared in 1964 in the first entry of the Pink Panther animated series, The Pink Phink. The Little Man was actually known by the animators at DePatie-Freleng as "Big Nose" and was originally created as a spoof and was done as a caricature of Friz Freleng as a joke. The character became a foil for the Pink Panther and appeared throughout the series in its 16-year duration.

The Little Man appears in various roles throughout the entire original series. He seldom speaks and has a distinctive big nose, and he is usually white in color but sometimes given a Caucasian shading. In some cases, he seems to be wearing nothing, but in other cases, he wears a costume (or at least a hat) fitting to his role in the cartoon. Several cartoons depict him with a white dog as his pet.

While he resembles The Inspector in the animated credits of Pink Panther films, the Little Man is usually said to be a caricature of Friz Freleng, with his mustache, short stature, and equally short temper. (These same characteristics of Freleng had previously served as an inspiration for Freleng's Warner Bros. cartoon character Yosemite Sam.)

The Little Man appears in the 1993 TV series The Pink Panther where he is voiced by Wallace Shawn. He goes by various names and fills multiple roles as he does in the shorts.

The Little Man also appears in the Cartoon Network show Pink Panther and Pals as a main character and main antagonist in the entire series (here renamed as Big Nose). He always has a plan to get rid of the teenaged Panther in an antagonistic manner, but the Panther consistently foils his plans. Sometimes his dog tries to get rid of the Pink Panther, only to side with the Pink Panther later in the short.

See also
 List of The Pink Panther cartoons

References

Animated human characters
Film characters introduced in 1964
Fictional mute characters
Fictional characters without a name
MGM cartoon characters
The Pink Panther characters
Fictional characters with dwarfism